Chuck Miller may refer to:
 Chuck Miller (musician) (1924–2000), American singer and pianist
 Charles A. Miller (political scientist) (1937–2019), American author and academic
 Chuck Miller (baseball) (1889–1961), Major League Baseball outfielder

See also
 Charles Miller (disambiguation)